Erlands Point is an unincorporated community and census-designated place (CDP) in Kitsap County, Washington, United States. As of the 2020 census, it had a population of 916. Prior to 2020, it was part of the Erlands Point-Kitsap Lake CDP.

Erlands Point is in the center of the county, on a point of land extending into Dyes Inlet from the west. Chico Bay, an arm of Dyes Inlet, borders the point to the north, and Ostrich Bay, another arm, borders the point to the east and south. The CDP is bordered by the city of Bremerton to the south, by the CDP of Kitsap Lake to the southwest, and by Chico to the northwest. To the northeast, across Dyes Inlet, is Tracyton, and to the southeast, across Ostrich Bay, is Rocky Point.

State Route 3 forms the western boundary of the Erlands Point CDP; the highway leads south into the western part of Bremerton and north  to Poulsbo.

References 

Populated places in Kitsap County, Washington
Census-designated places in Kitsap County, Washington
Census-designated places in Washington (state)